Joyce E. Salisbury is an American historian. She is professor emerita of humanistic studies (history) at the University of Wisconsin–Green Bay, where she was named Frankenthal Family distinguished professor in 1993.

Salisbury is the author of hundreds of publications and more than ten books that address early and medieval social and gender history, as well as early Christianity. Salisbury's edited volume, The Greenwood Encyclopedia of Daily Life: A Tour Through History from Ancient Times to the Present, won the American Library Association award for outstanding reference text in 2005.

Reviews of her books

References 

21st-century American women
American historians
American medievalists
American women historians
Living people
University of Wisconsin–Green Bay faculty
Year of birth missing (living people)